Schwerelos (English: "Weightless") is the twelfth studio album by German schlager singer Andrea Berg. It was released on 22 October 2010 in Germany and soon after in Austria and Switzerland. According to its certifications, the album has sold over one million copies.

Background 

In early 2010, Andrea Berg and her longtime producer Eugen Römer announced the end of their collaboration. According to Römer, he was having health problems and had decided to put off working with Berg for an undetermined amount of time. At her label's request, Dieter Bohlen was chosen to produce the album. Initially, Berg was sceptical about this choice, but met with Bohlen in Mallorca following her husband's advice. She was convinced by the song "Ich liebe dich" (English: "I Love You"), which was written by Bohlen and which he had presented to her during their meeting. She said: "When I heard it, I thought to myself: 'Someone who can compose such a song and who writes such lyrics has exactly the emotionality I need'." According to Berg, the switch to Bohlen radicalised her style a little bit, but Schwerelos is still a typical Andrea Berg album. Bohlen composed the songs and provided Berg with some lyric fragments that she used to write the final lyrics.

Track listing

Charts

Certifications 

 Platinum in 2011 for 60,000 units in Austria
 Gold in 2011 for 15,000 in Switzerland
 Platinum in 2012 for 1,000,000 units in Germany

See also 
 List of number-one hits of 2010 (Germany)
 List of number-one hits of 2010 (Austria)

External links 
 Andrea Berg's official website

References 

2010 albums
Andrea Berg albums
Schlager music albums